Kilarasampet is a small village in Ranipet district in the Indian state of Tamil Nadu. It is a small satellite town where many people go for work to places like Vellore, Chennai, and Bangalore.

Transport

Road 
Kilarasampet is well connected by roads. Kilarasampet is situated near National Highway NH 67 and is connected by road via the main accepted roads. Bus services operated by TNSTC connect major towns in the state and nearby towns in the district such as Vellore Arni Thiruvannamalai.

Rail 
Though Kilarsampet is not having any railway station there are many near by railway stations located for service.
 Katpadi Railway Station
 Kaniyambadi Railway Station
 Kannamangalam Railway Station

Air 
The nearest airport is Vellore.

Cities and towns in Ranipet district